The District of Columbia Housing Authority is an independent government agency whose mission is to provide affordable housing to extremely low- through moderate-income households, foster sustainable communities, and cultivate opportunities for residents to improve their lives throughout the eight wards of Washington, D.C.

One of the District’s largest landlords, DCHA provides subsidized housing to approximately 50,000 residents, nearly one-tenth of the District’s population. The waitlist for housing assistance was closed in April 2013. Since closed in May 2014, the authority has been in the midst of a campaign to identify those who still need assistance on the list.

DCHA manages 52 properties with approximately 8,000 public housing units. The authority also supplies more than 13,000 housing vouchers to District residents, including some 800 Veterans Affairs Supportive Housing (VASH) vouchers, more than 2,000 Local Rent Subsidy Program (LRSP) vouchers, and thousands from the federal Housing Choice Voucher Program (HCVP), formerly known as Section 8.

Nearly 19,500 families receive support from DCHA, the majority of those families have black women as the head of household. About 70 percent of those families are voucher holders. Nearly eight percent of DCHA's clients are elderly and 18 percent are disabled.

Finances

The District of Columbia Housing Authority had $560 million in net assets as of January 2013. More than 99 percent of DCHA's funding comes from the federal government. In 2012 and 2013, about 77 percent of the agency's total revenues were provided by the U.S. Department of Housing and Urban Development (HUD) for HCVP and an additional 11 percent for DCHA-administered public housing grants. Rents paid by public housing residents contributed seven percent of total revenues. The remaining four percent of revenue is from a variety of sources, including laundry rooms, service fees, grants, and philanthropic support.

More than 60 percent of operating revenue was allocated to providing housing assistance vouchers to tenants while the remaining 40 percent was used for maintenance, protective services, utilities, tenant services and programs, and administrative operations

Controversies

Headquarters redevelopment 
In 2013, the Housing Authority announced that it would put its headquarters building in the rapidly gentrifying NoMa neighborhood up for redevelopment. The redevelopment plans drew controversy as they originally only planned to require 70 units of deeply affordable housing on site and upon revision, the plans included 244 housing units reserved for moderate incomes rather than being deeply affordable. These 244 would be out of 1,200 market rate units the developer would be able to produce on site.

After significant criticism from activists and at-large Council member Elissa Silverman, the Housing Authority agreed to request at least half of the 244 units be available to be deeply affordable, albeit that request was not legally binding. The debate was framed by arguments that the Housing Authority was not serving its purpose housing the poorest residents of the District, but rather amplifying the effects of gentrification on the District.

Rent overpayments 
An investigation by The Washington Post in 2023 found that DCHA overpaid rents to landlords by millions of dollars. DCHA pays for the rent of 15,000 low-income households each year. Regulations require the Housing Authority to make sure that rents it pays for are market rate, but the investigation found that it failed to do so.

Conventionally Owned Public Housing Developments

There are more than 7,100 units in 52 traditional public housing developments. Of those properties, 14 serve the elderly and disabled. DCHA maintains an occupancy rate of approximately 75 percent. (According to the Director at the May 2021 Board of Commissioners meeting) Tenants pay 30 percent of their adjusted income towards rent. The average rent paid by a public housing household is approximately $250.

Northwest
 2905 11th Street
 Claridge Towers
 Colorado Apartments
 Columbia Road
 Garfield Terrace Family
 Garfield Terrace Senior
 Harvard Towers
 Horizon House
 James Apartments
 Judiciary House
 Kelly Miller
 LeDroit Apartments
 Oak Street Apartments
 Ontario Road
 Park Morton
 Regency House
 Scattered Sites
 Sibley Plaza 
 Sursum Corda
 Williston Apartments
Northeast
 Fort Lincoln
 Kenilworth Courts
 Langston Additions
 Langston Terrace
 Lincoln Heights
 Lincoln Road
 Montana Terrace
 Richardson Dwellings
Southwest
 Greenleaf Gardens
 Greenleaf Gardens Additions
 Greenleaf Gardens Extensions
 Greenleaf Senior
 James Creek
 Syphax Garden
Southeast
 Barry Farm
 Benning Terrace
 Carroll Apartments
 Elvans Road
 Fort Dupont Additions
 Fort Dupont Dwellings
 Highland Addition
 Highland Dwellings
 Hopkins Apartments
 Kentucky Courts
 Knox Hill
 Marley Ridge
 Potomac Gardens
 Potomac Senior
 Stoddert Terrace
 The Villager
 Wade Apartments
 Woodland Terrace

Mixed-Income Developments

DCHA has responsibility and financial interest in 23 mixed-income properties, but does not own them directly. Within those properties there are nearly 4,500 units, 3,900 of them are affordable, including more than 1,230 public housing units.

Northwest
 Gibson Plaza
 The Avenue at Park Morton
Northeast
 Capitol Gateway
 Edgewood Terrace
 4800 Nannie Hellen Burroughs
 MetroTowns
 St. Martin’s
 Victory Square Senior Apartments
Southeast
 Capital Quarters Townhomes I
 Capital Quarters Townhomes II
 Capper Senior I
 Capper Senior II
 Fairlawn Marshall
 Glenncrest
 Henson Ridge
 Kentucky Courts II
 Matthews Memorial Terrace
 Oxford Manor
 Sheridan Station Phase I
 Townhomes on Capitol Hill
 Triangle View
 Wheeler Creek Family
 Wheeler Creek Senior

References

Public housing in Washington, D.C.